Cut Sleeve Boys is a 2005 feature film written, produced and directed by Ray Yeung. The comedy follows the lives of two gay Asian best friends Mel (Steven Lim) and Ash (Chowee Leow) as they negotiate the gay scene of London.

Plot 
Mel and Ash are two British Chinese gay men who were at college together. After attending the funeral of a long lost friend, Gavin, a closet case from their university days, they start examining their lives. Mel, an aging muscle boy who wants to stay in the scene and party forever, rejects the love of Todd, because he thinks Todd is too provincial and not sophisticated enough for the metropolitan lifestyle.  Ash is unable to find a boyfriend, because he is considered too effeminate for the “macho” gay scene.  Following a chance encounter with Diane, a transsexual from their college days with a straight-acting lover, Ross, Ash decides to try cross-dressing. To his surprise, Ash finds that, in the West, an Asian woman is considered far more desirable than an Asian man.  Cut Sleeve Boys is a quirky satire on the gay scene's obsession with masculinity. It is a journey of self discovery for the two British Chinese protagonists, both having abandoned their individual identities in order to fit in.

Cast 
 Chowee Leow as Ashley Wang
 Steven Lim as Melvin Shu 
 Gareth Rhys Davis as Todd Charrington 
 Neil Collie as Ross Foreman 
 John Campbell as Diane/Dan
 Mark Hampton as Gavin Chan
 Paul Cox as Brad

Release 
 Cut Sleeve Boys premiered in January 2006 at the International Film Festival Rotterdam. The film was represented by Fortissimo Films for World Sales. It was sold to the USA, UK, Portugal, France, German speaking Europe, Benelux, Thailand, Taiwan and Philippines. The film had cinematic release in Bangkok and Taipei.
 Regent Releasing released the film in cinemas across USA including San Francisco, Los Angeles, Chicago, Minneapolis and Hollywood. Cut Sleeve Boys was also broadcast on Here! TV and Logo TV.
 TLA Releasing UK released the film in the United Kingdom.
 It screened in over 30 film festivals around the world including the Hong Kong International Film Festival, Bangkok International Film Festival, and Taipei Film Festival.

Reception 
Critics gave the film mixed reviews. Cut Sleeve Boys holds a 42% approval rating on Rotten Tomatoes.  Phil Hall from Film Threat  wrote "Something of a surprise: a gay-oriented feature that is genuinely touching and sincere."  Ken Fox from TV Guide wrote, "It's pretty much gay business as usual." Paul Malcolm from LA Weekly said, "Yeung handles [his characters'] parallel journeys of self-discovery with humor, grace and an occasionally heavy hand, with Leow giving a winning performance as Ash."  Rich Cline from Shadows on The Wall indicates the film as "surprisingly endearing as it tries to examine the nature of masculinity in a seriously un-masculine subculture."

Awards 
 Winner Best Feature at the 4th Fusion Festival in Outfest in 2006
 Winner Best Actor (to Chowee Leow) at the 11th LesGaiCineMad Madrid International LGBTI Film Festival in 2007
 Winner Audience Award for Best Feature at the 11th LesGaiCineMad Madrid International LGBTI Film Festival in 2007

References

External links
 
 "Cut Sleeve Boys" Fortissimo Films (distributor)
 

2005 films
2005 LGBT-related films